MBV may refer to:

m b v (album), a 2013 album by the band My Bloody Valentine
MBV Motorsports, a motorsport team
mbv, the code for the Mbulungish language, a Guinean language
MBV-78-A2 mine, a Vietnamese mine
 Master of Business Valuation

See also
My Bloody Valentine (disambiguation)